Information field theory (IFT) is a Bayesian statistical field theory relating to signal reconstruction, cosmography, and other related areas. IFT summarizes the information available on a physical field using Bayesian probabilities. It uses computational techniques developed for quantum field theory and statistical field theory to handle the infinite number of degrees of freedom of a field and to derive algorithms for the calculation of field expectation values. For example, the posterior expectation value of a field generated by a known Gaussian process and measured by a linear device with known Gaussian noise statistics is given by a generalized Wiener filter applied to the measured data. IFT extends such known filter formula to situations with nonlinear physics, nonlinear devices, non-Gaussian field or noise statistics, dependence of the noise statistics on the field values, and partly unknown parameters of measurement. For this it uses Feynman diagrams, renormalisation flow equations, and other methods from mathematical physics.

Motivation 
Fields play an important role in science, technology, and economy. They describe the spatial variations of a quantity, like the air temperature, as a function of position. Knowing the configuration of a field can be of large value. Measurements of fields, however, can never provide the precise field configuration with certainty. Physical fields have an infinite number of degrees of freedom, but the data generated by any measurement device is always finite, providing only a finite number of constraints on the field. Thus, an unambiguous deduction of such a field from measurement data alone is impossible and only probabilistic inference remains as a means to make statements about the field. Fortunately, physical fields exhibit correlations and often follow known physical laws. Such information is best fused into the field inference in order to overcome the mismatch of field degrees of freedom to measurement points. To handle this, an information theory for fields is needed, and that is what information field theory is.

Concepts

Bayesian inference 
 is a field value at a location  in a space . The prior knowledge about the unknown signal field  is encoded in the probability distribution . The data  provides additional information on  via the likelihood   that gets incorporated into the posterior probabilityaccording to Bayes theorem.

Information Hamiltonian 
In IFT Bayes theorem is usually rewritten in the language of a statistical field theory,with the information Hamiltonian defined asthe negative logarithm of the joint probability of data and signal and with the partition function beingThis reformulation of Bayes theorem permits the usage of methods of mathematical physics developed for the treatment of statistical field theories and quantum field theories.

Fields 
As fields have an infinite number of degrees of freedom, the definition of probabilities over spaces of field configurations has subtleties. Identifying physical fields as elements of function spaces provides the problem that no Lebesgue measure is defined over the latter and therefore probability densities can not be defined there. However, physical fields have much more regularity than most elements of function spaces, as they are continuous and smooth at most of their locations. Therefore less general, but sufficiently flexible constructions can be used to handle the infinite number of degrees of freedom of a field.

A pragmatic approach is to regard the field to be discretized in terms of pixels. Each pixel carries a single field value that is assumed to be constant within the pixel volume. All statements about the continuous field have then to be cast into its pixel representation. This way, one deals with finite dimensional field spaces, over which probability densities are well definable.

In order for this description to be a proper field theory, it is further required that the pixel resolution  can always be refined, while expectation values of the discretized field   converge to finite values:

Path integrals 
If this limit exists, one can talk about the field configuration space integral or path integral  irrespective of the resolution it might be evaluated numerically.

Gaussian prior 

A Gaussian probability distribution requires the specification of the field two point correlation function  with coefficients and a scalar product for continuous fields with respect to which the inverse signal field covariance  is constructed, i.e. 

The corresponding prior information Hamiltonian reads

Measurement equation 
The measurement data  was generated with the likelihood . It is essential to note that the response translates the infinite dimensional signal vector into the finite dimensional data space. In components this reads 

where a vector component notation was also introduced for signal and data vectors.

If the noise follows a signal independent zero mean Gaussian statistics with covariance ,  then the likelihood is Gaussian as well,and the likelihood information Hamiltonian isA linear measurement of a Gaussian signal, subject to Gaussian and signal independent noise leads to a free IFT.

Free theory

Free Hamiltonian 
From this is it clear, that the posterior must be a Gaussian with mean   and variance , where equality between the right and left hand sides holds as both distributions are normalized, .

Generalized Wiener filter 
The posterior meanis also known as the generalized Wiener filter solution and the uncertainty covariance  as the Wiener variance.

In IFT,  is called the information source, as it acts as a source term to excite the field (knowledge), and  the information propagator, as it propagates information from one location to another in

Interacting theory

Interacting Hamiltonian 
If any of the assumptions that lead to the free theory is violated, IFT becomes an interacting theory, with terms that are of higher than quadratic order in the signal field. This happens when the signal or the noise are not following Gaussian statistics, when the response is non-linear, when the noise depends on the signal, or when response or covariances are uncertain.

In this case, the information Hamiltonian might be expandable in a Taylor-Fréchet series,

The first and second order Taylor coefficients are often identified with the (negative) information source   and information propagator , respectively. The higher coefficients are associated with non-linear self-interactions.

Classical field 
The classical field  minimizes the information Hamiltonian,  and therefore maximizes the posterior:The classical field   is therefore the maximum a posteriori estimator of the field inference problem.

Critical filter 
The Wiener filter problem requires the two point correlation  of a field to be known. If it is unknown, it has to be inferred along with the field itself. This requires the specification of a hyperprior . Often, statistical homogeneity (translation invariance) can be assumed, implying that  is diagonal in Fourier space (for   being a   dimensional Cartesian space). In this case, only the Fourier space power spectrum  needs to be inferred. Given a further assumption of statistical isotropy, this spectrum depends only on the length  of the Fourier vector  and only a one dimensional spectrum  has to be determined. The prior field covariance reads then in Fourier space coordinates .

The corresponding information Hamiltonian iswhere  denotes equality up to irrelevant constants (here: constant with respect to ). In an empirical Bayes approach, the estimated   would be taken as given. As a consequence, the posterior mean estimate for the signal field is the corresponding   and its uncertainty the corresponding   in the empirical Bayes approximation.

The resulting non-linear filter is called the critical filter. Whenever the data variance exceeds this threshold slightly, the signal reconstruction jumps to a finite excitation level, similar to a first order phase transition in thermodynamic systems. For filter with   perception of the signal starts continuously as soon the data variance exceeds the noise level. Hence the name critical filter.

The critical filter, extensions thereof to non-linear measurements, and the inclusion of non-flat spectrum priors, permitted the application of IFT to real world signal inference problems, for which the signal covariance is usually unknown a priori.

IFT application examples 

The generalized Wiener filter, that emerges in free IFT, is in broad usage in signal processing. Algorithms explicitly based on IFT were derived for a number of applications. Many of them are implemented using the Numerical Information Field Theory (NIFTy) library.
 D³PO is a code for Denoising, Deconvolving, and Decomposing Photon Observations. It reconstructs images from individual photon count events taking into account the Poisson statistics of the counts and an instrument response function. It splits the sky emission into an image of diffuse emission and one of point sources, exploiting the different correlation structure and statistics of the two components for their separation. D³PO has been applied to data of the Fermi and the RXTE satellites.
 RESOLVE is a Bayesian algorithm for aperture synthesis imaging in radio astronomy. RESOLVE is similar to D³PO, but it assumes a Gaussian likelihood and a Fourier space response function. It has been applied to data of the Very Large Array.
 PySESA is a Python framework for Spatially Explicit Spectral Analysis for spatially explicit spectral analysis of point clouds and geospatial data.

Advanced theory 
Many techniques from quantum field theory can be used to tackle IFT problems, like Feynman diagrams, effective actions, and the field operator formalism.

Feynman diagrams 

In case the interaction coefficients   in a Taylor-Fréchet expansion of the information Hamiltonianare small, the log partition function, or Helmholtz free energy,
can be expanded asymptotically in terms of these coefficients. The free Hamiltonian specifies the mean  and variance  of the Gaussian distribution  over which the expansion is integrated. This leads to a sum over the set  of all connected Feynman diagrams. From the Helmholtz free energy, any connected moment of the field can be calculated via Situations where small expansion parameters exist that are needed for such a diagrammatic expansion to converge are given by nearly Gaussian signal fields, where the non-Gaussianity of the field statistics leads to small interaction coefficients . For example, the statistics of the Cosmic Microwave Background is nearly Gaussian, with small amounts of non-Gaussianities believed to be seeded during the inflationary epoch in the Early Universe.

Effective action 
In order to have a stable numerics for IFT problems, a field functional that if minimized provides the posterior mean field is needed. Such is given by the effective action or Gibbs free energy of a field. The Gibbs free energy  can be constructed from the Helmholtz free energy via a Legendre transformation. 
In IFT, it is given by the difference of the internal information energy  and the Shannon entropy for temperature , 
where a Gaussian posterior approximation  is used with the approximate data  containing the mean and the dispersion of the field.

The Gibbs free energy is then the Kullback-Leibler divergence  between approximative and exact posterior plus the Helmholtz free energy. As the latter does not depend on the approximate data , minimizing the Gibbs free energy is equivalent to minimizing the Kullback-Leibler divergence between approximate and exact posterior. Thus, the effective action approach of IFT is equivalent to the variational Bayesian methods, which also minimize the Kullback-Leibler divergence between approximate and exact posteriors.

Minimizing the Gibbs free energy provides approximatively the posterior mean field whereas minimizing the information Hamiltonian provides the maximum a posteriori field. As the latter is known to over-fit noise, the former is usually a better field estimator.

Operator formalism 
This generates the field expression  within the integral if applied to the Gaussian distribution function, and any higher power of the field if applied several times,If the information Hamiltonian is analytical, all its terms can be generated via the field operatorAs the field operator does not depend on the field  itself, it can be pulled out of the path integral of the internal information energy construction,where  should be regarded as a functional that always returns the value  irrespective the value of its input . The resulting expression can be calculated by commuting the mean field annihilator  to the right of the expression, where they vanish since . The mean field annihilator  commutes with the mean field as  

By the usage of the field operator formalism the Gibbs free energy can be calculated, which permits the (approximate) inference of the posterior mean field via a numerical robust functional minimization.

History 
The book of Norbert Wiener might be regarded as one of the first works on field inference. The usage of path integrals for field inference was proposed by a number of authors, e.g. Edmund Bertschinger or William Bialek and A. Zee. The connection of field theory and Bayesian reasoning was made explicit by Jörg Lemm. The term information field theory was coined by Torsten Enßlin. See the latter reference for more information on the history of IFT.

See also 
 Bayesian inference
 Bayesian hierarchical modeling
 Gaussian process
 Statistical Inference

References 

Bayesian inference
Bayesian statistics